Zygonyx torridus is a species of dragonfly in the family Libellulidae. It is found in Algeria, Angola, Benin, Botswana, Burkina Faso, Cameroon, Central African Republic, Comoros, the Republic of the Congo, Ivory Coast, Egypt, Ethiopia, Gambia, Ghana, Guinea, Kenya, Liberia, Malawi, Mali, Mauritius, Morocco, Mozambique, Namibia, Nigeria, Réunion, Sierra Leone, South Africa, Spain, Sudan, Tanzania, Togo, Uganda, Zambia, Zimbabwe, the United Arab Emirates and possibly Burundi. Its natural habitat is rivers and fast flowing streams.

References

Libellulidae
Taxonomy articles created by Polbot
Insects described in 1889